Good Sam may refer to:

 Good Sam (1948 film), an American romantic comedy starring Gary Cooper and Ann Sheridan
 Good Sam (2019 film), an American drama starring Tiya Sircar
 Good Sam (TV series), an American medical drama starring Sophia Bush and Jason Isaacs
 Good Sam Club, an organization for recreational vehicle (RV) owners
 Good Sam Enterprises, a membership organization for RV owners and camping enthusiasts

See also
 The Good Samaritan (disambiguation), a bible character and name of many organizations and related stories
 Sam Goode, a fictional character in Lorien Legacies young adult science fiction books
 Sam Goody, a music and entertainment retailer in the United States and United Kingdom